Monodilepas diemenensis is species of small sea snail, a keyhole limpet, a marine gastropod mollusc in the family Fissurellidae, the keyhole limpets and slit limpets.

This species is found at North Island, New Zealand.

Original description 
Monodilepas diemenensis was originally discovered and described by Harold John Finlay in 1930. Finlay's original text (the type description) reads as follows:

References
This article incorporates public domain text coming from New Zealand from the reference.

Further reading 
 Powell A. W. B., William Collins Publishers Ltd, Auckland 1979 

Fissurellidae
Gastropods described in 1930
Taxa named by Harold John Finlay